This is a list of the 60 largest towns and cities on the island of Ireland by population. It therefore includes towns and cities in both the Republic of Ireland and Northern Ireland. The population figures listed are for the urban area around each settlement excluding areas that fall within the boundary of another town or city. The figures for Northern Ireland towns are based on the 2011 Northern Ireland Census, while the figures for the Republic are based on the 2016 Census of Ireland. Settlements in bold have city status.

See also
List of urban areas in the Republic of Ireland by population
List of localities in Northern Ireland by population
List of places in Northern Ireland
List of Irish counties by population

References

Settlements